Grantsville Township is a township in Linn County, in the U.S. state of Missouri.

The township was named after Ulysses S. Grant, an officer in the Civil War and afterward 18th President of the United States.

References

Townships in Missouri
Townships in Linn County, Missouri